Fred Huntington (December 12, 1912 – August 10, 1998) was an entrepreneur and cartridge wildcatter involved in the shooting industry. Huntington founded RCBS which is today one of the leading manufacturers of cartridge handloading equipment. He also developed the .243 Rock Chucker cartridge which lead to the development of the .244 Remington (later renamed 6mm Remington).

References

1912 births
1998 deaths
American company founders
20th-century American businesspeople
American manufacturing businesspeople
Place of birth missing
Place of death missing
Gunsmiths